Ay Amor may refer to:
Ay, Amor, a 1996 album by Ana Bárbara
"Ay Amor" (Ana Gabriel song), 1987
"Ay Amor" (Fonseca song), 2011
:es:Ay! amor, single by Nena Daconte
"Ay Amor", a 2003 song by Héctor & Tito from La Historia Live
"Ay Amor", a song by Myriam Hernández
"¡Ay! Amor", a song by Lorenzo Antonio
"¡Ay Amor!", a 1997 song by MDO from MDO